Legislative elections were held in Åland on 17 and 18 October 1971.

Results

References

Elections in Åland
Aland
1971 in Finland